John Vijay (born 20 November 1976) is an Indian actor who plays supporting roles in Tamil films. He has also worked in a few Malayalam, Telugu, Hindi and Kannada films.

Career
John Vijay did his M.Sc. in Visual Communication from Loyola College, Chennai. Vijay also works as the head programme director of Radio One FM. John is the chief of 'H2O', an advertising agency with its office at Nungambakkam.

Pushkar and Gayatri, who were his juniors in the Visual Communications course in Loyola College, offered him a role in their directorial debut Oram Po. His performance as "Sun of Gun" in the film was described by critics as "scene stealer, his antics bring the house down". He played a friend of Rajinikanth in Kabali (2016).

Filmography

Tamil films

Malayalam films

Telugu films

Hindi films

Kannada films

References

External links
 

Indian male film actors
Tamil male actors
Male actors from Chennai
Living people
1976 births
Tamil comedians